Spectrum Radio was a multi-ethnic radio network based in London. It catered to over 20 different ethnic communities.

Spectrum Radio was distinguished by its multiethnic, foreign language programmes, many of which had been on air since its launch in 1990. Before its closure, it broadcast programmes for the British Chinese community in both Cantonese and Mandarin.

Originally on 558 kHz, the station switched to DAB only under the name Spectrum Radio after changing back from Panda Radio.

In 2019 the station's studio moved to a new facility on London's South Bank.

In February 2020, the station was issued with a winding up order by the High Court and its broadcasting license was therefore suspended.

Network
Spectrum Radio (DAB and online)
Chinese Spectrum (online, two hours a day)
Sout-al-Khaleej (DAB and online)
Spectrum World Music Radio (online)

References

External links

Chinese Spectrum

Radio stations in London
Multilingual broadcasters